The Banca Romana scandal''' surfaced in January 1893 in Italy over the bankruptcy of the Banca Romana, one of the six national banks authorised at the time to issue currency. The scandal was the first of many Italian corruption scandals, and discredited both ministers and parliamentarians, in particular those of the Historical Left and was comparable to the Panama Canal Scandal that was shaking France at the time, threatening the constitutional order. The crisis prompted a new banking law, tarnished the prestige of the Prime Ministers Francesco Crispi and Giovanni Giolitti and prompted the collapse of the latter's government in November 1893.

Background
The Banca Romana was founded by French and Belgian investors in 1833 under the jurisdiction of Pope Gregory XVI. (Other sources mention 1835) After the fall of the short-lived Roman Republic in 1849, the bank was renamed Banca dello Stato Pontificio in 1850, and became the official bank of the Papal States, acquiring a monopoly of currency issue, deposit collection, and credit in the Papal States. Following the annexation of the Papal States to Italy in 1870, the bank retook its former name of Banca Romana. At the time, Italy had no central bank and in 1874 the Banca Romana was made one of the six banks authorised by the Italian government to issue currency.
 
Due to rising inflation and easy credit, the Banca Romana and the five other issue banks (banks that were allowed to issue banknotes), had steadily increased their note circulation. In 1887 five of the issue banks had exceeded their legal limit, a fact well known to the government and banking and financial circles. However, restricting credit during a speculative construction boom was considered politically impossible. Since the late 1880s, the Italian economy had been sliding into a deep recession. New tariffs had been introduced in 1887 on agricultural and industrial goods and a trade war with France followed, which badly damaged Italian commerce. Many farmers, especially in southern Italy, suffered severely, which eventually led to the uprising of the Fasci Siciliani. Additionally the collapse of a speculative boom based on a substantial urban rebuilding programme gravely damaged Italian banks.

Under the direction of Ludovico Guerrini (1870–81) the bank had been managed prudently and its banknote circulation had remained within the legal limits. However, his successor as governor of the Banca Romana, Bernardo Tanlongo, was a peculiar man, semi-literate but with a genius for accounts and finance. "He was not a womanizer, he never played, he is the antithesis of all elegance, his frugality resembles avarice," was how the Corriere della Sera once described him. A former farm hand and former spy during the Roman Republic in 1849, he made his career in the bank in the Papal State, providing illicit entertainment to Vatican officials. Tanlongo remained at his post in the Banca Romana after the Italian unification and was promoted governor in 1881. Over the years, Tanlongo had built an influential network through strong personal connections with Roman aristocrats and businessmen, freemasons and Jesuit clerics, top government officials and industrialists, including the Royal Family. He was their agent in real estate speculations, and subsequently started to speculate on his own account. He had a remarkable ability to secure friendships and protection by providing loans to cover up secrets.

Government inspection

In 1889, three Turin banks heavily involved in financing speculative building in Rome suspended payments. The note-issuing banks were persuaded by the government to bail out other banks in order to avoid a major disaster.Clark, Modern Italy, pp. 119–22 They were allowed to issue bank notes in excess of their reserves and legal limits in an attempt to steer clear of economic recession. However, this caused them to become entangled in the crisis.

In June 1889 inspections of the Banca Romana by a government commission revealed serious irregularities in its administration and accounts and that 91 percent of the assets of the bank were illiquid. Moreover, the bank's directors had committed a criminal offence by permitting an additional number of banknotes with duplicate numbering to be printed. The Banca Romana had loaned large sums to property developers but was left with huge liabilities when the real estate bubble collapsed in 1887. One of the government reports concluded: 

Prime Minister Francesco Crispi and his Treasury Minister Giovanni Giolitti knew of the 1889 government inspection report, but feared that exposure might undermine public confidence and suppressed the report. In addition, they also wanted to avoid it becoming known that the Banca Romana, like other banks, had extended substantial loans to politicians (including themselves), often without interest. This was a common way for politicians to finance election expenses in return for favours. Over the next three years there was much talk of the need for a single note-issuing bank and for a reduction in the note circulation. But neither Crispi nor his successors, Antonio Di Rudinì and Luigi Luzzatti, had the courage to cope with the revelations and the political turmoil which any serious effort at banking reform was bound to trigger.

 The scandal erupts 
Giolitti, who was prime minister from May 1892 to November 1893, tried to get the governor of Banca Romana, Tanlongo, appointed as senator, which would have given him immunity from prosecution. Before Giolitti could appoint the former bank governor, the report was leaked to  deputies Napoleone Colajanni and Lodovico Gavazzi who divulged its contents to the Parliament at the end of 1892. On December 20, 1892, Colajanni read out long extracts in Parliament and Giolitti was forced to appoint an expert commission to investigate the note-issuing banks. The close friendship of Giolitti's Treasury Minister, Bernardino Grimaldi, with Tanlongo and the introduction of a bill – endorsed by Giolitti and then withdrawn – giving the existing banks the right to issue currency for another six years, increased suspicions of wrongdoing.

The expert commission report, published on January 18, 1893, confirmed the serious state of affairs in the Banca Romana: a deficiency of cash, cooked accounts, a note circulation of 135 million lire instead of the 75 million lire permitted by law, a great quantity of bad debts due to speculation in building, and 40 million lire in a duplicated series of notes that had been printed in Britain but not issued owing to the honesty of minor officials of the bank. Politicians had received money to finance their election expenses and to run or bribe newspapers. The next day, Tanlongo, the bank's director Cesare Lazzaroni, and several subordinates were arrested, but they were acquitted by the Court on July 15, 1894.Tanlongo Not Guilty; Jury Acquits Him of Fraud in Managing the Banca Romana, The New York Times, July 29, 1894 Tanlongo accused Giolitti of receiving money through the Director General of the Treasury Carlo Cantoni, Agriculture Minister Pietro Lacava, and Grimaldi.

New banking law and Giolitti's fall

The scandal prompted a new investigation and accelerated the process of passing a new banking law to address the liquidity of Italian banks. Giolitti was well fitted to deal with the technical side of the problem, and he acted with energy, albeit belatedly. The Bank Act of August 1893 liquidated the Banca Romana and reformed the whole system of note issuance, restricting the privilege to the new Banca d'Italia – mandated to liquidate the Banca Romana – and to the Banco di Napoli and the Banco di Sicilia. The new law also provided for stricter state control of banknote issuance.

The main purpose of the reform, however, was to rapidly solve the financial problems of the Banca Romana, as well as to cover up a scandal that involved many politicians, rather than to design a new national banking system. Regional interests were still strong; hence the compromise that permitted three note issuing banks. The reform neither immediately restored confidence nor achieved
establishment of a single note issuing bank, as envisaged by Finance Minister Sidney Sonnino, but it was nevertheless a sound reform, strengthening the leading role of the newly formed Banca d'Italia  which was  seen  as  a  decisive  step  towards  the  unification  of  note  issuance and the control of money supply in Italy.

Politically, however, Giolitti did not survive the scandal. He had been Finance Minister in the government that had suppressed the original 1889 report. As Prime Minister he had borrowed from the Banca Romana for governmental purposes in August 1892, had nominated the bank's governor, Tanlongo, to the Senate, and had resisted a parliamentary enquiry, encouraging suspicions that he had something to hide. Tanlongo and the Banca Romanas tried to defame Giolitti, calculating that a change of government would result in the release of the defendants.

On November 23, 1893, at the opening of the Italian Parliament, the Italian Chamber of Deputies insisted that the sealed report of the Commission that investigated the bank scandals be read immediately. The conclusions of the Commission, that former Prime Minister Crispi, Prime Minister Giolitti, and former Finance Minister Luigi Luzzatti had been aware of the condition of the Banca Romana but had held back that information, were hailed amidst disorder with shouts for the resignation of Giolitti. Rival deputies exchanged insults and pushed and pulled each other over seats and desks over a disputed effort to impeach the government. While the President of the Chamber, Giuseppe Zanardelli, and the minister left the session, deputies refused orders to leave until the light was turned off at 10 PM. Opposition deputies were cheered by a large crowd that had assembled on the street. Colajanni incited the multitude, shouting: "You are faint hearted! You have no convictions. If you had, you would put the torch to this parliamentary hovel!"

Many politicians were implicated but Giolitti was targeted in particular: "He knew of the bank's irregularities as early as 1889," the report said, "although as late as last February he declared that he did not know of them." The Commission concluded that pressing charges that Giolitti had used the bank's money in the last election campaign could not been proved although it declined to affirm that it was disproved. Giolitti had to resign on November 24, 1893.

Giolitti's counter attack

Increasing the crisis, the Giolitti and the Crispi-Tanlongo camp leaked documents to the detriment of both politicians. The trial against Tanlongo and other directors of the bank for embezzlement and other fraudulent practices began on May 2, 1894. Testimony at the trial revealed that Giolitti had been aware of the condition of the Banca Romana in 1889, but had held back that information. Giolitti also allegedly received money from the bank for election purposes. Emotions at the trial sometimes ran high; once leading to an adjournment due to a fierce fist-fight between former Minister Luigi Miceli and a Bank Inspector, who testified against Miceli. The acquittal of Bernardo Tanlongo and the other Banca Romana defendants in July 1894 freed Giolitti's successor as Prime Minister, Francesco Crispi, to engage in open warfare against Giolitti. Tanlongo and his co-defendants were acquitted on the grounds that the "major criminals are elsewhere" – an obvious reference to Giolitti (and a striking contrast to the sentences passed on the leaders of the Fasci Siciliani). In September 1894 Crispi subsequently ordered the prosecution of police officials for abstracting documents from Tanlongo's house that allegedly incriminated Giolitti.

Giolitti now had an opportunity to counter-attack, releasing a package of documents compromising Crispi with evidence that he had concealed from the parliamentary inquiry financial transactions and debts contracted by Crispi, his family and friends with the Banca Romana. On December 11, 1894, the package – known as the "Giolitti envelope" – was handed to the President of the Chamber of Deputies. A committee of five was appointed to examine the new evidence, including Felice Cavallotti, one of Crispi's main allies. However, confronted with the new facts he realised that Giolitti had been misjudged. Notes of the Banca Romana cashier implicated Prime Minister Crispi (with several drafts and a note for 1,050,000 lire), as well as the former president of the Chamber, Giuseppe Zanardelli, Giolitti's former Treasury Minister, Bernardino Grimaldi and other ex-Ministers. Some journalists received 200,000 lire and others 75,000 lire for press and election services. Letters from Bernardo Tanlongo explained that the deficit of the bank was due to disbursements to Ministers, Senators and members of the press.

Aftermath
After the publication of the committee's report on December 15, 1894, Crispi dissolved the Chamber by decree amidst increasing protests, which compelled Giolitti – now that his parliamentary immunity was lifted – to leave the country; officially to visit his daughter in Berlin. Crispi denounced the Giolitti documents as a mass of lies, but rumours of Crispi's resignation turned out to be unfounded. Five battalions of infantry had been brought to Rome to quell possible riots. Giolitti was accused of embezzlement as well as libel against Crispi and his wife, and was summoned before the courts in February 1895 after the Public Prosecutor, sustained by lower courts, had started the prosecution. However, on April 24, 1895, the Supreme Court decided that Giolitti could not be tried by an ordinary civil court, as Giolitti had argued, because he had made his accusations against Crispi in the Chamber. Only the Senate could hear the case.Crispi's Tormentor Sustained; Ex-Premier Giolitti May Not Be Tried by a Civil Tribunal, The New York Times, April 25, 1895

Despite Crispi's resounding victory at the general elections in May 1895, the scandal would backfire against him. On July 24, the Government decided to present Giolitti's evidence about the role of Crispi in the scandal and other matters to the Chamber of Deputies and to have a special commission examine them. In June 1895, the French newspaper Le Figaro published documents compromising Crispi, showing evidence that he had concealed financial transactions and debts contracted by Crispi, his family and friends with the Banca Romana, from the 1893 parliamentary inquiry . Giolitti regained much of his prestige after the political debate in December 1895 when the Chamber declined to indict Giolitti, who had asked to be brought for the Senate.De Grand, The Hunchback's Tailor, p. 64 The scandal was now hurriedly buried after nearly three years. Most of the shortcomings had been political negligence rather than criminal but the uproar about bribes and cover-ups had discredited political and banking institutions and the reputation of politicians. The prestige of both Crispi and Giolitti was tarnished substantially, favouring the so-called Extreme Left headed by Cavallotti.

In popular culture
In 1977 the Italian state television channel Rete Due (now Rai 2) broadcast a mini series on the scandal in three parts. On January 17–18, 2010, Rai Uno broadcast a two-part mini series directed by Stefano Reali.

 References 

Sources
 Clark, Martin (1984/2014). Modern Italy, 1871 to the Present, New York: Routledge, 
 De Grand, Alexander J. (2001). The hunchback's tailor: Giovanni Giolitti and liberal Italy from the challenge of mass politics to the rise of fascism, 1882–1922, Wesport/London: Praeger,  (online edition)
 Duggan, Christopher (2008). The Force of Destiny: A History of Italy Since 1796, Houghton Mifflin Harcourt, 
 Pani, Marco (2017). Crisis and Reform: The 1893 Demise of Banca Romana, IMF Working Paper (WP/17/274), December 2017.
 Pohl, Manfred & Sabine Freitag (European Association for Banking History) (1994). Handbook on the history of European banks, Aldershot: Edward Elgar Publishing, 
 Sarti, Roland (2004). Italy: a reference guide from the Renaissance to the present, New York: Facts on File Inc., 
 Seton-Watson, Christopher (1967). Italy from liberalism to fascism, 1870–1925'', New York: Taylor & Francis, 1967

External links
  Commissione d'inchiesta sulle banche, Archivio storico della Camera dei deputati

1893 in Italy
1894 in Italy
1895 in Italy
Politics of Italy
Modern history of Italy
Bank failures
Corporate scandals
1893 crimes in Italy
1894 crimes in Italy
1895 crimes in Italy